Seven O'clock Mountain is a  summit located near the Pemberton Valley of British Columbia, Canada.

Description

Precipitation runoff and glacial meltwater from the mountain's north slope drains to Cerulean Lake thence Tenquille Creek; from the southeast slope to Tenas Creek; and from the southwest slope to Ogre Lake thence Owl Creek. All three creeks are tributaries of the Birkenhead River. The mountain's toponym was officially adopted January 23, 1979, by the Geographical Names Board of Canada.

Climate
Based on the Köppen climate classification, Seven O'clock Mountain is located in a subarctic climate zone of western North America. Most weather fronts originate in the Pacific Ocean, and travel east toward the Coast Mountains where they are forced upward by the range (Orographic lift), causing them to drop their moisture in the form of rain or snowfall. As a result, the Coast Mountains experience high precipitation, especially during the winter months in the form of snowfall. Winter temperatures can drop below −20 °C with wind chill factors below −30 °C. This climate supports remnants of the Bluevault Glacier on the north slope. The months July through September offer the most favorable weather for climbing Seven O'clock Mountain.

See also
 
 Geography of British Columbia

References

External links
 Weather: Seven O'clock Mountain

Two-thousanders of British Columbia
Pacific Ranges
Lillooet Land District
Coast Mountains
Pemberton Valley
Lillooet Country